Thelairodrino is a genus of flies in the family Tachinidae.

Species
T. gracilis (Mesnil, 1952)

References

Exoristinae
Diptera of Asia
Tachinidae genera